Parupeneus pleurostigma, commonly known as the sidespot goatfish and round-spot goatfish, is a marine fish belonging to the family Mullidae.

Distribution
This species is native to the Indian and Pacific oceans, from East Africa to Hawaii, Line Islands, Marquesas Islands and Tuamotus, from Ryukyu to Lord Howe Island, Rapa Iti and French Polynesia.

Habitat

Description

They have nine dorsal soft rays, seven anal soft ray and sixteen pectoral rays. Snout is slightly convex and the margin of caudal-fin lobes is straight to slightly convex.

Body color range from pinkish to yellowish gray, with a broad black spot on lateral line, sometimes followed by a large pinkish spot. A black band is present below the basal dorsal fin and blue spots on the scales above lateral line. The two barbels extending form the chin are pale pink to white.

Biology
These goatfishes are usually solitary. They feed during the day on small fish and invertebrates, as gastropods, crabs, crustaceans (mainly crabs and shrimps), polychaetes and worms, foraminiferans, brittle stars and heart urchins, found by means of the two barbels.

References

 Randall, J. E. (2004). "Revision of the goatfish genus Parupeneus (Perciformes: Mullidae), with descriptions of two new species". Indo-Pacific Fishes. (36): 64.

External links
 

Fish of Thailand
Marine fauna of East Africa
Fish described in 1831
Fish of the Pacific Ocean
Fish of the Indian Ocean
pleurostigma